Leyla Jerrie Josephine Bornebusch (born 12 September 1981) is a Swedish actress.

Career
Bornebusch was involved in Vår teater, a children's theatre, as a child. She began her acting career in the Swedish drama series Rederiet in 1999 and a year later, she starred alongside Alexander Skarsgård in the films White Water Fury and Wings of Glass. In 2002, Bornebusch again acted in a film alongside Skarsgård as one of the lead roles of the film The Dog Trick. She was an actress in the comedy show Playa del Sol on SVT1. She was also one of the regular hosts of Fredag Hela Veckan, a Swedish version of Saturday Night Live. She starred as the character "Mickan" in the comedy series Solsidan.

Bornebusch is a writer, associate producer, and female lead opposite Greg Poehler in Welcome to Sweden which was broadcast on TV4 in Sweden and on NBC in the United States. The series was cancelled on 28 July 2015.

Bornebusch wrote and directed the TV series Älska mig in which she also plays the lead role, the series premiered in October 2019, with a second season starting in April 2020.

Personal life
In July 2014, Bornebusch revealed that she was pregnant with her first child. In late August of the same year, she gave birth to a son. In November 2016, her second child, a daughter, was born.

Filmography

Television

Film

Discography

Singles
2011: "I'm So Happy" (Salem Al Fakir feat. Josephine Bornebusch)

References

External links

1981 births
Living people
Swedish film actresses
Swedish television actresses
Actresses from Stockholm
20th-century Swedish actresses
21st-century Swedish actresses
Swedish television producers
Women television producers